Wild Game: My Mother, Her Lover, and Me is a 2019 memoir by American writer Adrienne Brodeur. The memoir is centered around the author's relationship with her mother, Malabar Brewster. Brodeur helps her mother hide an affair from her (the mother's) husband. The story begins in July 1980. Brodeur was 14 years old at that time. Brodeur accompanies her mother and her lover (known in the book as Ben Souther) on walks and waits for them as they go off on their trysts.

Ilana Masad of National Public Radio stated that the novel, "for all its luscious prose and tantalizing elements, is ultimately about the slow and painful process of losing a mother." Masad wrote that the work "reads very much like a novel with a first-person narrator".

Emily Rapp Black of The New York Times wrote that the author "does not reject her mother, [...] but neither does she become her or soft-pedal the ways in which Malabar continues to wound her."

Background
The author used her parents' actual names but changed the names of other parties.

Brodeur's mother, Malabar, was a food writer for The Boston Globe. The book's title comes from the title of a would-be cookbook that Malabar planned to write with her husband, Charles, her lover, Ben, a hunter, and Ben's wife, Lily.

Brodeur stated that her mother supported her efforts to have the book written; by the time it was completed, the mother's illness was too severe for her to read the book. Malabar, by 2019, had dementia.

Reception
Wild Game was named a national best seller. It won the New England Society of New York 2020 Book Award in the nonfiction category  and was ranked by People (magazine) as one of the 10 best books of 2019. Amazon (company) also ranked the book as a best book of 2019.

In her The New York Times review, Rapp Black wrote, "The book is so gorgeously written and deeply insightful, and with a line of narrative tension that never slacks, from the first page to the last, that it’s one you’ll likely read in a single, delicious sitting." Jennifer Haupt of Psychology Today wrote that the book is "inspiring" and "moving, masterful". In a review published in The Guardian, Elizabeth Lowry called the book, "Polished but very dark ... A memoir of sex, animal innards and a daughter who is too polite to her narcissist mother".

Publishers Weekly, which deemed it a featured book, wrote that it is "page-turning" and "This layered narrative of deceit, denial, and disillusionment is a surefire bestseller."

Film adaptation
In 2018, Kelly Fremon Craig was announced to be adapting the book into a film for Chernin Entertainment.

References

2019 non-fiction books
American memoirs
Mariner Books books
Chatto & Windus books